Brisbane Roar Football Club is an Australian professional association football club based in Milton, Brisbane. The club was formed in 1957 as Hollandia-Inala before it was renamed to Brisbane Lions in 1977, and then Queensland Lions in 2005. Brisbane Roar became the first Queensland member admitted into the A-League Men in 2005.

The list encompasses the honours won by Brisbane Roar at national and friendly level, records set by the club, their managers and their players. The player records section itemises the club's leading goalscorers and those who have made most appearances in first-team competitions. It also records notable achievements by Brisbane Roar players on the international stage, and the highest transfer fees paid and received by the club. Attendance records at Lang Park, the club's home ground since 2005 and Dolphin Stadium are also included.

Brisbane Roar have won five top-flight titles. The club's record appearance maker is Matt McKay, who made 303 appearances between 2005 and 2019. Besart Berisha is Brisbane Roar's record goalscorer, scoring 50 goals in total.

All figures are correct as of 6 January 2023

Honours and achievements

Domestic
 National Soccer League (until 2004) and A-League Men Premiership
 Winners (2): 2010–11, 2013–14
 Runners-up (1): 2011–12

 National Soccer League (until 2004) and A-League Men Championship
 Winners (3): 2011, 2012, 2014

 NSL Cup
 Winners (1): 1981

Other

Pre-season
 Surf City Cup
 Winners (1): 2019

Player records

Appearances
 Most league appearances: Matt McKay, 272
 Most FFA Cup appearances: Jamie Young, 6
 Most Asian appearances: Thomas Broich, 14
 Youngest first-team player: Jordan Courtney-Perkins, 16 years, 274 days (against Sydney FC, A-League, 7 August 2019)
 Oldest first-team player: Massimo Maccarone, 38 years, 226 days (against Melbourne City, A-League, 20 April 2018)
 Most consecutive appearances: Erik Paartalu, 85 (from 8 August 2010 to 12 January 2013)

Most appearances
Competitive matches only, includes appearances as substitute. Numbers in brackets indicate goals scored. Players in bold are currently playing for Brisbane Roar

a. Includes the National Soccer League and A-League Men.
b. Includes the A-League Pre-Season Challenge Cup and Australia Cup
c. Includes goals and appearances (including those as a substitute) in the 2005 Australian Club World Championship Qualifying Tournament.

Goalscorers
 Most goals in a season: Besart Berisha, 23 goals (in the 2011–12 season)
 Most league goals in a season: Besart Berisha, 21 goals in the A-League, 2011–12)
 Most goals in a match: 4 goals (against Adelaide United, A-League, 28 October 2011)
 Youngest goalscorer: Tommy Oar, 17 years, 18 days (against Wellington Phoenix, A-League, 28 December 2008)
 Oldest goalscorer: Massimo Maccarone, 38 years, 156 days (against Melbourne Victory, A-League, 9 February 2018)

Top goalscorers
Competitive matches only, includes appearances as substitute. Numbers in brackets indicate appearances made.

a. Includes the National Soccer League and A-League Men.
b. Includes the A-League Pre-Season Challenge Cup and Australia Cup
c. Includes goals and appearances (including those as a substitute) in the 2005 Australian Club World Championship Qualifying Tournament.

Awards
 A-League Golden Boot
  Alex Brosque – 2005–06
  Besart Berisha – 2011–12
  Jamie Maclaren – 2016–17

 A-League Coach of the Year
  Ange Postecoglou – 2010–11
  Mike Mulvey – 2013–14

 A-League Goalkeeper of the Year
  Michael Theoklitos – 2010–11
  Jamie Young – 2017–18

 A-League Young Footballer of the Year
  Tommy Oar – 2009–10
  Jamie Maclaren – 2015–16
  Jamie Maclaren – 2016–17

 A-League Goal of the Year
  Erik Paartalu – 2010–11
  Éric Bauthéac – 2018–19

 Johnny Warren Medal
  Thomas Broich – 2011–12
  Thomas Broich – 2013–14

 Joe Marston Medal
  Thomas Broich – 2014

International
This section refers to caps won while a Brisbane Roar player.

 First capped player: Colin Bennett, for Australia against Israel on 12 February 1977.

Managerial records

 First full-time manager: Rado Vidošić managed Brisbane Roar from 1 January 2005 to 30 June 2005.
 Longest-serving manager: John Aloisi –  (26 May 2015 to 28 December 2018)
 Shortest tenure as manager: Rado Vidošić – 1 day (14 October 2009 to 15 October 2009)
 Highest win percentage: Mike Mulvey, 50.00%
 Lowest win percentage: Darren Davies (caretaker), 16.67%

Club records

Matches

Firsts
 First match: Hollandia-Inala 7–1 Postal Institute, Brisbane Division Two, 1964
 First A-League Men match: Queensland Roar 2–0 New Zealand Knights, 28 August 2005
 First national cup match: Brisbane City 3–2 Brisbane Lions, NSL Cup, 21 September 1977
 First Australia Cup match: Stirling Lions 0–4 Brisbane Roar, Round of 32, 19 August 2014
 First Asian match: Brisbane Roar 0–2 FC Tokyo, AFC Champions League group stage, 6 March 2012
 First match at Perry Park: Brisbane Lions 0–1 Canberra City, National Soccer League, 10 April 1977
 First match at Lions Stadium: Brisbane Lions 1–2 South Melbourne, National Soccer League, 16 March 1980
 First match at Suncorp Stadium: Queensland Roar 2–0 New Zealand Knights

Record wins
 Record league win:
 7–1 against Footscray JUST, National Soccer League, 7 March 1982
 7–1 against Adelaide United, A-League, 28 October 2011
 Record national cup win: 7–0 against Annerley, NSL Cup first round, 30 July 2005
 Record Asian win: 6–0 against Global, Second preliminary round, 31 January 2017

Record defeats
 Record league defeat: 0–6 against Adelaide City, National Soccer League, 17 June 1979
 Record national Cup defeat: 1–5 against Melbourne Victory, FFA Cup Round of 32, 9 August 2017
 Record Asian defeat: 0–6 against Ulsan Hyundai, Group stage, 21 February 2017

Record consecutive results
Brisbane Roar hold the record for the longest unbeaten sequence in the top flight, with 36.

 Record consecutive wins: 5
 from 26 January 2011 to 19 February 2011
 from 13 March 2011 to 28 October 2011
 from 10 May 2022 to 31 August 2022
 Record consecutive defeats: 7, from 26 April 2017 to 22 October 2017
 Record consecutive matches without a defeat: 36, from 18 September 2010 to 26 November 2011
 Record consecutive matches without a win: 12, from 30 November 2018 to 2 February 2019
 Record consecutive matches without conceding a goal: 4
 from 30 July 2005 to 2 September 2005
 from 2 November 2007 to 25 November 2007
 from 8 August 2010 to 5 September 2010
 from 13 February 2013 to 2 March 2013
 Record consecutive matches without scoring a goal: 4
 from 5 November 2006 to 24 November 2006
 from 28 November 2021 to 12 January 2022

Points
 Most points in a season: 65 in 30 matches, A-League, 2010–11
 Fewest points in a season: 12 in 26 matches, National Soccer League, 1988

Attendances
This section applies to attendances at Lang Park, where Brisbane Roar played their home matches since 2005 and Dolphin Stadium, their switch ground since 2020.

 Highest attendance at Lang Park: 51,153 against Western Sydney Wanderers, A-League Grand Final, 4 May 2014
 Lowest attendance at Lang Park: 3,245 against Ulsan Hyundai, AFC Champions League group stage, 10 May 2017
 Highest attendance at Dolphin Stadium: 9,387 against Melbourne City, A-League, 17 November 2019
 Lowest attendance at Dolphin Stadium: 1,600 against Wellington Phoenix, A-League Men, 30 March 2022

See also
 Brisbane Roar FC
 A-League Men
 List of Brisbane Roar FC players
 Brisbane Roar end of season awards
 A-League all-time records

References

External links
 Brisbane Roar website
 A-League website

Brisbane Roar
Records
Roar